Dingolfing-Landau is a Landkreis (district) in Bavaria, Germany. It is bounded by (from the north and clockwise) the districts of Straubing-Bogen, Deggendorf, Rottal-Inn and Landshut.

History
The district was established in 1972 by merging the former districts of Dingolfing and Landau (Isar). Its original name was Untere Isar ("Lower Isar"), but in 1973 it was renamed and got its present name.

Geography
The region is characterised by very plain countryside and several rivers running from southwest to northeast (towards the Danube). Most important rivers of the district are the Isar and the Vils.

Economy

The whole region depends on the automobile industry. At Dingolfing, you can find the largest  BMW-Industry complex in the world.

Coat of arms
The coat of arms displays:
 The blue and white checkered pattern of Bavaria
 The lion from the arms of the county of Leonberg (once ruling in Landau)
 The red and white bars are from the arms of the county of Frontenhausen (once ruling in Dingolfing)

Towns and municipalities

References

External links

Official website (German)
 Big architectural photos of old churches in the district

 
Districts of Bavaria